The Madness of Crowds may refer to:

 Extraordinary Popular Delusions and the Madness of Crowds, an 1841 book by Charles Mackay
 The Madness of Crowds (Troy Donockley album), 2009
 The Madness of Crowds (Ingrid Laubrock album), 2011
 The Madness of Crowds: Gender, Race and Identity, a 2019 book by Douglas Murray

See also
 The Wisdom of Crowds